The province of East Java in Indonesia is divided into 29 kabupaten (or regencies) and 9 kotamadya (or cities); these in turn are divided administratively into districts, known as kecamatan, of which there were 666 in 2020.	These comprise 8,501 administrative villages (kelurahan in urban areas and desa in rural areas).	

The districts of East Java, with the regency or city each falls into, are as follows:

A-E

Ajung, Jember
Ambulu, Jember
Ambunten, Sumenep
Ampelgading, Malang
Arjasa, Jember
Arjasa, Situbondo
Arjasa, Sumenep
Arjosari, Pacitan
Arosbaya, Bangkalan
Asembagus, Situbondo
Asemrowo, Surabaya
Babadan, Ponorogo
Babat, Lamongan
Badas
Badegan, Ponorogo
Bagor, Nganjuk
Bakung, Blitar
Balen, Bojonegoro
Balerejo, Madiun
Balong, Ponorogo
Balongbendo, Sidoarjo
Balongpanggang, Gresik
Balung, Jember
Bancar, Tuban
Bandar Kedungmulyo, Jombang
Bandar, Pacitan
Bandung, Tulungagung
Bangil, Pasuruan
Bangilan, Tuban
Bangkalan, Bangkalan
Bangorejo, Banyuwangi
Bangsal, Mojokerto
Bangsalsari, Jember
Bantaran, Probolinggo
Bantur, Malang
Banyakan, Kediri
Banyuanyar, Probolinggo
Banyuates, Sampang
Banyugluglur, Situbondo
Banyuputih, Situbondo
Banyuwangi, Banyuwangi
Barat, Magetan
Bareng, Jombang
Baron, Nganjuk
Batang Batang, Sumenep
Batu Marmar, Pamekasan
Batu, Batu
Batuan, Sumenep
Batuputih, Sumenep
Baureno, Bojonegoro
Beji, Pasuruan
Bendo, Magetan
Bendungan, Trenggalek
Benjeng, Gresik
Benowo, Surabaya
Berbek, Nganjuk
Besuk, Probolinggo
Besuki, Situbondo
Besuki, Tulungagung
Binakal, Bondowoso
Binangun, Blitar
Blega, Bangkalan
Blimbing, Malang
Bluluk, Lamongan
Bluto, Sumenep
Bojonegoro, Bojonegoro
Bondowoso, Bondowoso
Boyolangu, Tulungagung
Bringin, Ngawi
Brondong, Lamongan
Bubulan, Bojonegoro
Bubutan, Surabaya
Buduran, Sidoarjo
Bugulkidul, Pasuruan
Bulak, Surabaya
Bululawang, Malang
Bumiaji, Batu
Bungah, Gresik
Bungatan, Situbondo
Bungkal, Ponorogo
Burneh, Bangkalan
Camplong, Sampang
Campurdarat, Tulungagung
Candi, Sidoarjo
Candipuro, Lumajang
Cerme, Gresik
Cermee, Bondowoso
Cluring, Banyuwangi
Curahdami, Bondowoso
Dagangan, Madiun
Dampit, Malang
Dander, Bojonegoro
Dasuk, Sumenep
Dau, Malang
Dawarblandong, Mojokerto
Deket, Lamongan
Diwek, Jombang
Dlanggu, Mojokerto
Doko, Blitar
Dolopo, Madiun
Dongko, Trenggalek
Donomulyo, Malang
Dringu, Probolinggo
Driyorejo, Gresik
Duduk Sampeyan, Gresik
Dukuh Pakis, Surabaya
Dukun, Gresik
Dungkek, Sumenep
Durenan, Trenggalek

F-J

Gading, Probolinggo
Gadingrejo, Pasuruan
Galis, Bangkalan
Galis, Pamekasan
Gambiran, Banyuwangi
Gampengrejo, Kediri
Ganding, Sumenep
Gandusari, Blitar
Gandusari, Trenggalek
Gapura, Sumenep
Garum, Blitar
Gayam, Sumenep
Gayungan, Surabaya
Gedangan, Malang
Gedangan, Sidoarjo
Gedeg, Mojokerto
Geger, Bangkalan
Geger, Madiun
Gemarang, Madiun
Gempol, Pasuruan
Gending, Probolinggo
Geneng, Ngawi
Genteng, Banyuwangi
Genteng, Surabaya
Gerih, Ngawi
Giligenteng, Sumenep
Giri, Banyuwangi
Glagah, Banyuwangi
Glagah, Lamongan
Glenmore, Banyuwangi
Gondang Wetan, Pasuruan
Gondang, Bojonegoro
Gondang, Mojokerto
Gondang, Nganjuk
Gondang, Tulungagung
Gondanglegi, Malang
Grabagan, Tuban
Grati, Pasuruan
Gresik, Gresik
Grogol, Kediri
Grujugan, Bondowoso
Gubeng, Surabaya
Gucialit, Lumajang
Gudo, Jombang
Guluk-Guluk, Sumenep
Gumukmas, Jember
Gununganyar, Surabaya
Gurah, Kediri
Jabon, Sidoarjo
Jabung, Malang
Jambangan, Surabaya
Jambon, Ponorogo
Jangkar, Situbondo
Jatibanteng, Situbondo
Jatikalen, Nganjuk
Jatirejo, Mojokerto
Jatirogo, Tuban
Jatiroto, Lumajang
Jelbuk, Jember
Jenangan, Ponorogo
Jenggawah, Jember
Jenu, Tuban
Jetis, Mojokerto
Jetis, Ponorogo
Jiwan, Madiun
Jogorogo, Ngawi
Jogoroto, Jombang
Jombang, Jember
Jombang, Jombang
Jrengik, Sampang
Junrejo, Batu

K-O

Kabat, Banyuwangi
Kabuh, Jombang
Kademangan, Blitar
Kademangan, Probolinggo
Kadur, Pamekasan
Kalianget, Sumenep
Kalibaru, Banyuwangi
Kalidawir, Tulungagung
Kalipare, Malang
Kalipuro, Banyuwangi
Kalisat, Jember
Kalitengah, Lamongan
Kalitidu, Bojonegoro
Kaliwates, Jember
Kamal, Bangkalan
Kampak, Trenggalek
Kandangan, Kediri
Kandat, Kediri
Kangean, Sumenep
Kanigaran, Probolinggo
Kanigoro, Blitar
Kanor, Bojonegoro
Kapas, Bojonegoro
Kapongan, Situbondo
Karangan, Trenggalek
Karanganyar, Ngawi
Karangbinangun, Lamongan
Karanggeneng, Lamongan
Karangjati, Ngawi
Karangpilang, Surabaya
Karangploso, Malang
Karangrejo, Magetan
Karangrejo, Tulungagung
Karas, Magetan
Kare, Madiun
Kartoharjo, Madiun
Kartoharjo, Magetan
Kasembon, Malang
Kasiman, Bojonegoro
Kasreman, Ngawi
Kauman, Ponorogo
Kauman, Tulungagung
Kawedanan, Magetan
Kebomas, Gresik
Kebonagung, Pacitan
Kebonsari, Madiun
Kedamean, Gresik
Kedewan, Bojonegoro
Kediri, Kediri
Kedopok, Probolinggo
Kedungadem, Bojonegoro
Kedungdung, Sampang
Kedunggalar, Ngawi
Kedungjajang, Lumajang
Kedungkandang, Malang
Kedungpring, Lamongan
Kedungwaru, Tulungagung
Kejayan, Pasuruan
Kembangbahu, Lamongan
Kemlagi, Mojokerto
Kencong, Jember
Kendal, Ngawi
Kendit, Situbondo
Kendungan, Ngawi
Kenduruan, Tuban
Kenjeran, Surabaya
Kepanjen, Malang
Kepanjenkidul, Blitar
Kepohbaru, Bojonegoro
Kepung, Kediri
Kerek, Tuban
Kertosono, Nganjuk
Kesamben, Blitar
Kesamben, Jombang
Ketapang, Sampang
Klabang, Bondowoso
Klakah, Lumajang
Klampis, Bangkalan
Klojen, Malang
Kokop, Bangkalan
Konang, Bangkalan
Kota Sumenep, Sumenep
Kotaanyar, Probolinggo
Kraksaan, Probolinggo
Kras, Kediri
Kraton, Pasuruan
Krejengan, Probolinggo
Krembangan, Surabaya
Krembung, Sidoarjo
Krian, Sidoarjo
Kromengan, Malang
Krucil, Probolinggo
Kudu, Jombang
Kunir, Lumajang
Kunjang, Kediri
Kuripan, Probolinggo
Kutorejo, Mojokerto
Kwadungan, Ngawi
Kwanyar, Bangkalan
Labang, Bangkalan
Lakarsantri, Surabaya
Lambeyan, Magetan
Lamongan, Lamongan
Larangan, Pamekasan
Laren, Lamongan
Lawang, Malang
Leces, Probolinggo
Ledokombo, Jember
Lekok, Pasuruan
Lembeyan, Magetan
Lengkong, Nganjuk
Lenteng, Sumenep
Licin, Banyuwangi
Loceret, Nganjuk
Lowokwaru, Malang
Lumajang, Lumajang
Lumbang, Pasuruan
Lumbang, Probolinggo
Madiun, Madiun
Maduran, Lamongan
Maesan, Bondowoso
Magersari, Mojokerto
Magetan, Magetan
Malo, Bojonegoro
Manding, Sumenep
Mangaran, Situbondo
Manguharjo, Madiun
Mantingan, Ngawi
Mantup, Lamongan
Manyar, Gresik
Maospati, Magetan
Margomulyo, Bojonegoro
Maron, Probolinggo
Masalembu, Sumenep
Mayang, Jember
Mayangan, Probolinggo
Megaluh, Jombang
Mejayan, Madiun
Menganti, Gresik
Merakurak, Tuban
Mlandingan, Situbondo
Mlarak, Ponorogo
Modo, Lamongan
Modung, Bangkalan
Mojo, Kediri
Mojoagung, Jombang
Mojoanyar, Mojokerto
Mojoroto, Kediri
Mojosari, Mojokerto
Mojowarno, Jombang
Montong, Tuban
Mulyorejo, Surabaya
Mumbulsari, Jember
Muncar, Banyuwangi
Munjungan, Trenggalek
Nawangan, Pacitan
Ngadiluwih, Kediri
Ngadirojo, Pacitan
Ngajum, Malang
Ngambon, Bojonegoro
Ngancar, Kediri
Nganjuk, Nganjuk
Ngantang, Malang
Ngantru, Tulungagung
Ngariboyo, Magetan
Ngasem, Bojonegoro
Ngawi, Ngawi
Ngebel, Ponorogo
Ngetos, Nganjuk
Ngimbang, Lamongan
Nglegok, Blitar
Ngluyu, Nganjuk
Ngoro, Jombang
Ngoro, Mojokerto
Ngraho, Bojonegoro
Ngrambe, Ngawi
Ngrayun, Ponorogo
Ngronggot, Nganjuk
Nguling, Pasuruan
Nguntoronadi, Magetan
Ngunut, Tulungagung
Ngusikan, Jombang
Nonggunong, Sumenep
Omben, Sampang

P-R

Pabean Cantikan, Surabaya
Pace, Nganjuk
Pacet, Mojokerto
Paciran, Lamongan
Pacitan, Pacitan
Padang, Lumajang
Padangan, Bojonegoro
Padas, Ngawi
Pademawu, Pamekasan
Pagak, Malang
Pagelaran, Malang
Pagerwojo, Tulungagung
Pagu, Kediri
Paiton, Probolinggo
Pajarakan, Probolinggo
Pakal, Surabaya
Pakel, Tulungagung
Pakem, Bondowoso
Pakis, Malang
Pakisaji, Malang
Pakong, Pamekasan
Pakuniran, Probolinggo
Pakusari, Jember
Palang, Tuban
Palengaan, Pamekasan
Pamekasan, Pamekasan
Panarukan, Situbondo
Panceng, Gresik
Pandaan, Pasuruan
Panekan, Magetan
Panggul, Trenggalek
Panggungrejo, Blitar
Pangkur, Ngawi
Panji, Situbondo
Panti, Jember
Papar, Kediri
Parang, Magetan
Parengan, Tuban
Paron, Ngawi
Pasean, Pamekasan
Pasirian, Lumajang
Pasongsongan, Sumenep
Pasrepan, Pasuruan
Pasrujambe, Lumajang
Patianrowo, Nganjuk
Patrang, Jember
Pegantenan, Pamekasan
Perak, Jombang
Pesanggaran, Banyuwangi
Pesantren, Kediri
Peterongan, Jombang
Pilangkenceng, Madiun
Pitu, Ngawi
Plandaan, Jombang
Plaosan, Magetan
Plemahan, Kediri
Ploso, Jombang
Plosoklaten, Kediri
Plumbang, Tuban
Pogalan, Trenggalek
Pohjentrek, Pasuruan
Poncokusumo, Malang
Poncol, Magetan
Ponggok, Blitar
Ponorogo, Ponorogo
Porong, Sidoarjo
Pragaan, Sumenep
Prajekan, Bondowoso
Prajurit Kulon, Mojokerto
Prambon, Nganjuk
Prambon, Sidoarjo
Prigen, Pasuruan
Pringkuku, Pacitan
Pronojiwo, Lumajang
Proppo, Pamekasan
Pucanglaban, Tulungagung
Pucuk, Lamongan
Pudak, Ponorogo
Puger, Jember
Pujer, Bondowoso
Pujon, Malang
Pule, Trenggalek
Pulung, Ponorogo
Puncu, Kediri
Pungging, Mojokerto
Punung, Pacitan
Puri, Mojokerto
Purwoasri, Kediri
Purwodadi, Pasuruan
Purwoharjo, Banyuwangi
Purworejo, Pasuruan
Purwosari, Bojonegoro
Purwosari, Pasuruan
Puspo, Pasuruan
Raas, Sumenep
Rambipuji, Jember
Randuagung, Lumajang
Ranuyoso, Lumajang
Rejoso, Nganjuk
Rejoso, Pasuruan
Rejotangan, Tulungagung
Rembang, Pasuruan
Rengel, Tuban
Ringinrejo, Kediri
Robatal, Sampang
Rogojampi, Banyuwangi
Rowokangkung, Lumajang
Rubaru, Sumenep
Rungkut, Surabaya

S

Sambeng, Lamongan
Sambikerep, Surabaya
Sambit, Ponorogo
Sampang, Sampang
Sampung, Ponorogo
Sanankulon, Blitar
Sananwetan, Blitar
Sangkapura, Gresik
Sapeken, Sumenep
Saradan, Madiun
Sarirejo, Lamongan
Saronggi, Sumenep
Sawahan, Madiun
Sawahan, Nganjuk
Sawahan, Surabaya
Sawoo, Ponorogo
Sedati, Sidoarjo
Sekar, Bojonegoro
Sekaran, Lamongan
Selopuro, Blitar
Selorejo, Blitar
Semampir, Surabaya
Semanding, Tuban
Semboro, Jember
Semen, Kediri
Sempol, Bondowoso
Sempu, Banyuwangi
Sendang, Tulungagung
Senduro, Lumajang
Senori, Tuban
Sepulu, Bangkalan
Sidayu, Gresik
Sidoarjo, Sidoarjo
Siliragung, Banyuwangi
Silo, Jember
Siman, Ponorogo
Simokerto, Surabaya
Sine, Ngawi
Singgahan, Tuban
Singojuruh, Banyuwangi
Singosari, Malang
Situbondo, Situbondo
Slahung, Ponorogo
Socah, Bangkalan
Soko, Tuban
Sokobanah, Sampang
Solokuro, Lamongan
Songgon, Banyuwangi
Sooko, Mojokerto
Sooko, Ponorogo
Srengat, Blitar
Sreseh, Sampang
Srono, Banyuwangi
Suboh, Situbondo
Sudimoro, Pacitan
Sugihwaras, Bojonegoro
Sugio, Lamongan
Sukapura, Probolinggo
Sukodadi, Lamongan
Sukodono, Lumajang
Sukodono, Sidoarjo
Sukolilo, Surabaya
Sukomanunggal, Surabaya
Sukomoro, Magetan
Sukomoro, Nganjuk
Sukorambi, Jember
Sukorame, Lamongan
Sukorejo, Blitar
Sukorejo, Pasuruan
Sukorejo, Ponorogo
Sukosari, Bondowoso
Sukosewu, Bojonegoro
Sukowono, Jember
Sukun, Malang
Sumber Malang, Situbondo
Sumber, Probolinggo
Sumberasih, Probolinggo
Sumberbaru, Jember
Sumberejo, Bojonegoro
Sumbergempol, Tulungagung
Sumberjambe, Jember
Sumbermanjing Wetan, Malang
Sumberpucung, Malang
Sumbersari, Jember
Sumbersoko, Lumajang
Sumberwringin, Bondowoso
Sumobito, Jombang
Suruh, Trenggalek
Sutojayan, Blitar

T

Tajinan, Malang
Takeran, Magetan
Talango, Sumenep
Talun, Blitar
Taman, Madiun
Taman, Sidoarjo
Tamanan, Bondowoso
Tambak, Gresik
Tambakboyo, Tuban
Tambakrejo, Bojonegoro
Tambaksari, Surabaya
Tambelangan, Sampang
Tanah Merah, Bangkalan
Tandes, Surabaya
Tanggul, Jember
Tanggulangin, Sidoarjo
Tanggung Gunung, Tulungagung
Tanjunganom, Nganjuk
Tanjungbumi, Bangkalan
Tapen, Bondowoso
Tarik, Sidoarjo
Tarokan, Kediri
Tegalampel, Bondowoso
Tegaldlimo, Banyuwangi
Tegalombo, Pacitan
Tegalsari, Banyuwangi
Tegalsari, Surabaya   
Tegalsiwalan, Probolinggo
Tekung, Lumajang
Temayang, Bojonegoro
Tembelang, Jombang
Tempeh, Lumajang
Tempurejo, Jember
Tempursari, Lumajang
Tenggarang, Bondowoso
Tenggilis Mejoyo, Surabaya
Tikung, Lamongan
Tiris, Probolinggo
Tirtoyudo, Malang
Tlanakan, Pamekasan
Tlogosari, Bondowoso
Tongas, Probolinggo
Torjun, Sampang
Tosari, Pasuruan
Tragah, Bangkalan
Trawas, Mojokerto
Trenggalek, Trenggalek
Trowulan, Mojokerto
Trucuk, Bojonegoro
Tuban, Tuban
Tugu, Trenggalek
Tulakan, Pacitan
Tulangan, Sidoarjo
Tulungagung, Tulungagung
Tumpang, Malang
Turen, Malang
Turi, Lamongan
Tutur, Pasuruan

U-Z

Udanawu, Blitar
Ujung Pangkah, Gresik
Umbulsari, Jember
Wagir, Malang
Wajak, Malang
Walikukun, Ngawi
Waru, Pamekasan
Waru, Sidoarjo
Wates, Blitar
Wates, Kediri
Watulimo, Trenggalek
Widang, Tuban
Widodaren, Ngawi
Wilangan, Nganjuk
Winongan, Pasuruan
Wiyung, Surabaya
Wlingi, Blitar
Wongsorejo, Banyuwangi
Wonoasih, Probolinggo
Wonoasri, Madiun
Wonoayu, Sidoarjo
Wonocolo, Surabaya
Wonodadi, Blitar
Wonokromo, Surabaya
Wonomerto, Probolinggo
Wonorejo, Pasuruan
Wonosalam, Jombang
Wonosari, Bondowoso
Wonosari, Malang
Wonotirto, Blitar
Wringin, Bondowoso
Wringinanom, Gresik
Wuluhan, Jember
Wungu, Madiun
Yosowilangun, Lumajang 

 
East Java

id:Kategori:Kecamatan di Jawa Timur